Stateless is an Australian television drama series launched on ABC TV on 1 March 2020.  The six episodes were released on Netflix on 8 July 2020.

The series is partly inspired by the real-life story of Cornelia Rau, an Australian who was unlawfully detained under the Australian Government's mandatory detention program.

Synopsis
The series centres on four strangers in an immigration detention centre in the Australian desert: an airline hostess escaping a suburban cult, an Afghan refugee fleeing persecution, a young Australian father escaping a dead-end job and a bureaucrat caught up in a national scandal. When their lives intersect they are pushed to the brink of sanity, yet unlikely and profound emotional connections are made amongst the group.

After the sixth and final episode, the epilogue states the program was based upon true stories about Australian immigration detention.

Cast

Episodes

Production
The series is partly inspired by the real-life story of Cornelia Rau, an Australian who was unlawfully detained under the Australian Government's mandatory detention program.

Blanchett says that the title "refers to statelessness in a more poetic sense, not in a legal, physical sense. It's more about  identity and the loss of people's identity when they are faced with long-term detention, when they become a number, when they are dislocated from markers in their life like home and culture, and separated from their families".

The music for the series was composed by Cornel Wilczek

Release 
Stateless had its world premiere at the 70th Berlin International Film Festival in February 2020, in the new Series section, along with Mystery Road Series 2.

The Australian television channel ABC premiered the series in Australia soon afterwards,  on 1 March 2020. Netflix released the series globally on 8 July 2020.

Awards and nominations
The script for Episode 6 by Elise McCredie was shortlisted for the Betty Roland Prize for Scriptwriting at the 2021 New South Wales Premier's Literary Awards.

References

External links
 

2020 Australian television series debuts
Television shows set in South Australia
Television shows filmed in Australia
Television shows filmed in East Timor
Australian Broadcasting Corporation original programming
Television series by Matchbox Pictures
Television series created by Tony Ayres
English-language television shows